Kulaki is a rural locality (a village) in Ilkinskoye Rural Settlement, Melenkovsky District, Vladimir Oblast, Russia. The population was 220 as of 2010. There are 3 streets.

Geography 
Kulaki is located on the Unzha River, 17 km south of Melenki (the district's administrative centre) by road. Kudrino is the nearest rural locality.

References 

Rural localities in Melenkovsky District
Melenkovsky Uyezd